Nebria aenea is a species of black coloured ground beetle in the  Nebriinae subfamily that can be found in Kazakhstan and Russia.

References

Beetles described in 1825
Beetles of Asia
aenea